Kvachi Kvachantiradze is a novel written by Mikheil Javakhishvili in 1924. It was translated by Donald Rayfield in 2015. This is the best-known picaresque novel written in Georgia.

History 
This book was originally a collection of sketches. Javakhishvili decided in 1924 to rework it into a novel, which was published in 1925. As it glorified pre-war France and condemned the Russian Revolution and the Soviet invasion of Georgia, a new version was issued in 1934, heavily censored by the Soviet authorities. Even in 2011, the reissue only used the 1934 text, not the 1925 one. This translation uses the 1925 text.

Plot 
The hero of this book, Kvachi Kvachantiradze, is a thoroughly scurrilous rogue but, like many a literary rogue, a charming one. He charms us and he charms the people he meets, who seem to be not only unaware of his treachery but even thank him for his help. The book starts with the day of his birth, an auspicious day. There is a heavy thunderstorm. A tree is broken in two by lightning and the only other inn in town, a rival of the inn of Kvachi's father, Silibistro, is destroyed. The baby Kvachi is born already uttering the word me. A fortune teller forecasts that he will be a great man, get what he wants and bring fortune to his family. Apart from a brief digression about how his parents came to marry (they are cousins), we immediately follow Kvachi's early life. He is a very precocious child, walking and talking early, and helping in his parents' inn.

Silibistro is snobbish and is certain that he descends from nobles but cannot prove it. He spends a fortune on doing so, till he finally gets a man to issue him with a certificate of nobility. The man is a notorious swindler but Silibistro is happy with his certificate and becomes even more snobbish. Kvachi is sent to Kutaisi (the second largest city in Georgia) to study and it is here that he develops his sharp ways. He stays with a couple, he an elderly man, she, Tsviri, much younger. As they do not have a child of their own, Tsviri starts mothering him but, as he gets older, mothering becomes loving and he becomes her lover, for which she gives him gifts. Little does she know that she is not the first but she soon finds out that he sees (and is paid by) other women. Kvachi is very astute with money. He borrows at an opportune moment, promising to repay promptly but, of course, never does. When someone is short, he offers to lend them money but never does.

From earning money as a gigolo, Kvachi and his friends, soon upgrade to extortion and are indifferent as to whom they extort from, including poor widows. Eventually, he makes enough money to get his parents a house, while he moves off to Odessa, nominally to study law. He does start studying but, as Javakhishvili points out, Georgians are easily distracted and lazy and all they really want to do is to carouse, which they do. He still carries on his various methods of extortion, becoming more sophisticated in his approach.

Women continue to be his weak spot. He falls in love with Mme Lapoche (i.e. French for The Pocket) and gives her many presents but she and her husband are smarter than Kvachi. He tries selling stoves and then insurance (which, of course, leads to an insurance scam.) The gang moves to St Petersburg, where he has more trouble with women, almost raping a young woman who resists his charms. He even manages to meet Rasputin but is then horrified, when his latest girlfriend would rather sleep with Rasputin than with him. However, he gains Rasputin's confidence and thus access to the Tsar, which allows hm to perpetrate a whole range of scams.

Soon he is off again, travelling around Europe - to Warsaw, Vienna, Paris and ending up in London, where money and scams keep him busy. By the start of World War I, he is back in Russia where we learn, though history has kept silent about it, he is responsible for killing Rasputin and starting both the February and October Russian revolutions. He joins the Reds and the Whites, sometimes both on the same day. It is not surprising that the Soviets objected to this book. He becomes much involved in both revolutions though not forgetting to make large sums of money for himself. Inevitably, things do not always go well.

Characters 
 Kvachi Kvachantiradze - The "hero" of this book.
 Silibistro Kvachantiradze - Kvachi's father.
 Pupi - Kvachi's mother.
 Notio - Kvachi's grandmother.
 Khukhu - Kvachi's grandfather.
 Budu Sholia - Owner of inn in Kutaisi
 Tsviri - Budus wife.
 Beso Shiqia - Kvachi's friend.
 Jalil - Kvachi's friend.
 Grigori Rasputin -  Russian peasant, mystical faith healer and a trusted friend to the family of Nicholas II, the last Tsar of Russia. He became friend of Kvachi.
 Ladi Chikinjiladze - Kvachi's friend.
 Rebeca - Kvachi's Women.
 Elene - Kvachi's Women.
 Madame Lapoche - Kvachi's Women.

Structure and themes

Kvachi Kvachantiradze
Kvachi is a good old-fashioned rogue's tale, chronicling the (mis)adventures of one Kvachi Kvachantiradze in early twentieth-century Georgia, Russia, and beyond. The setting and the tumultuous times – leading through the First World War, the Russian Revolution and civil war, and the early Soviet Union period – aren't entirely unfamiliar, as numerous Russian and the Soviet authors of the period chronicled these in often similarly outrageous stories and novels, but the Georgian angle adds a less familiar perspective – and Javakhishvili (who would be executed under Stalin's regime in 1937) puts his own entertaining spin on all this. Kvachi was already precocious as an infant, and much was expected from him; he would not disappoint – except those, that is, who put their trust in him and his wild claims. Of course, small-time Georgia provided limited opportunities – he's well aware: "Georgia is too small to contain me" – and, while occasionally returning briefly, he progressively distanced himself from it in trying to make his way in the world: mother Russia offered considerably more opportunities. Opportunities for fleecing folks, too: among Kvachi's greatest talents is that of conning people – he's a natural --, and here too a locale that isn't quite as incestuous as Georgia, where everyone seems to know everyone, proves advantageous. After some youthful cons back home, Kvachi does have a go of sorts at taking the traditional route, beginning his studies – law – in Odessa. But though he and his buddies make a sincere effort at buckling down, well ... "they were Georgians and their enthusiasm gradually waned". Soon enough, Kvachi is making an 'honest' living as an insurance salesman – ideal training ground, and a task for which he is well-suited:

Business
He even insures his father – and has him fake his death – in an elaborate final con to fleece his own employer, once he's ready to move on. From Odessa Kvachi heads to the Russian capital, Petersburg, where he live it up in high style; his financial wheeling and dealing make for his reputation, as one magazine puts it, of: "Our Morgan" (as in J.P.). Yes, "Kvachi the businessman, Kvachi the financier, Kvachi the shareholder" enjoys great success – for a while. But, as happens repeatedly, his whole house of cards collapses. Kvachi's life is all about cash-flow. He goes for – and often achieves – the big coups, but he's not particularly good at actually handling money. He burns through vast amounts of it – whatever is at hand, regardless of how much. He enjoys the high-life – as high as he can get away with – but lives only for the day, making little effort at proper investment or management. Easy come, easy go, indeed. Kvachi is actually very generous, too – always throwing money around, when he has it (and sometimes throwing it around when he doesn't – he's generous with other people's money, too) – but it is an unsustainable lifestyle. Not that he seems to mind the repeated collapse of his fortunes – not that he should, maybe: he always has the next con up his sleeve. Eventually he even takes Europe and America by storm – he even: "tried out the geishas" in Japan --, leaving city after "kvachified" city in his wake:

Rasputin
Javakhishvili gives it a go, though this is a novel that races about as well, often only skimming the surface of Kvachi's cons, and even describing the more elaborate ones quickly. What others would use to fill an entire stand-alone book – such as Kvachi and his buddies convincing a bank and the police that they are filmmakers, making preparations to film a bank-robbery scene, and then using that as cover to actually rob the bank – here are just another in the very quick succession of harebrained (yet often successful) cons Kvachi pulls off. Kvachi remains almost always focused on the next big con, with a bit of seduction and taking care of his friends and family on the side. He admits: "History's never been my thing", but he lives in times when history can't be ignored, and he gets pulled in too. He befriends, of all people, an even larger-than-life figure than he is, Rasputin, whose proximity to and influence with the royals is obviously something Kvachi finds hard to resist. As Javakhishvili has it, Kvachi plays a significant role in some of Rasputin's doings – as well as in his end. It doesn't end there, either, as Russia's descent into the First World War and then into revolution and civil war chaos also draw Kvachi in. Indeed, Javakhishvili claims nothing less for his hero than:

Of course, pretty much everything that Kvachi does tends to be self-serving – though adjusted for the prevailing circumstances – and so even his most heroic exploits, such as when he winds up in actual battle, just happen to put his talents in the service of both his own survival and the greater good. Kvachi understands:

In revolutionary Russia it can be hard to tell which side has the upper hand – "Russia has gone made", Kvachi notes – and he even shows a bit of patriotic fire. Briefly independent after 1917, Georgia couldn't stay out of Soviet clutches long, the British helping them hold out briefly but then leaving, leading to the inevitable:

After revolution
Of course, Kvachi can adjust to almost any conditions, and the New Economic Plan of the 1920s affords him quite a few opportunities: "NEP has revived the old convenient and profitable ways". Which at least works out for a while .....Kvachi isn't an entirely harmless rogue: he has blood on his hands – willing to resort to murder to escape prison (and, admittedly, an imminent hanging-sentence), for example – and his treatment of the women in his life is rather shocking, right down to the final arrangements he makes when most of his plans have gone bust. His conscience doesn't seem to trouble him, and Javakhishvili seems sympathetic to the nearly-everything-goes (lack of) ethics, which makes it a bit hard to sympathize with the character. The gullibility of nearly everyone Kvachi encounters does offer a bit of justification: whether pompous wealthy folk or women with unrealistic romantic ideals, everyone seems to almost want to get taken by Kvachi and his outlandish claims and promises. The rush of adventure, in very tumultuous times, and the range make for an entertaining read. Beyond that, in post-tsarist Russia, the novel also takes on a sharper and more political edge. Kvachi may be an opportunist, but as Javakhishvili repeatedly shows, idealism was in limited supply, and none of the sides particularly pure. (Indeed, Javakhishvili did not take his own advice in his portrayal of the victorious Bolsheviks – an attitude that would come to more than haunt him, leading to his death in Stalin's purges just over a decade later.)A nicely sweeping novel of Georgia and Russia (and, to some extent, Europe) in the first decades of the twentieth century, Kvachi has a bit of a rough feel to it: much of it originally published as separate stories, it has been fused together into a complete novel, but doesn't quite flow like it might have had it been a novel-project from the beginning.

Main translations 
 Novel was translated in German language in 1986 – Das fürstliche Leben des Kwatschi
 Novel was translated in Arabic language in 1994 – مغامرات كفاتشي / "Maghamarat Kwantshi" 
 Novel was translated in Russian language in 1999  –  «Каналья»
 Novel was translated in English language in 2014 – Kvachi
 Novel was translated in Turkish language in 2017 – Madrabaz Kvaçi
Novel was translated in French language in 2022 – Les aventures de Kvatchi Kvatchantiradzé

References

External links 

Novel  - Goodreads.com
novel's review in publishersweekly.com
Nothing But a Hound Dog: Mikheil’s Javakhishvili’s ‘Kvachi’
THE HERO THAT HISTORY FORGOT: MIKHEIL JAVAKHISHVILI’S KVACHI, TRANSLATED BY DONALD RAYFIELD
Novel in amazon.com

1924 novels
20th-century Georgian novels
Georgian-language works
Novels by Mikheil Javakhishvili
Picaresque novels
Grotesque
Satirical novels
Georgian novels adapted into films
Dalkey Archive Press books